State Highway 96 (SH 96) is a state highway in eastern Colorado. Its western terminus is an intersection with SH 69 in Westcliffe. Its eastern terminus is at the Kansas state line, east of Towner, where it continues as K-96.

Frontier Pathways Scenic and Historic Byway
The section of the highway between Pueblo and Silver Cliff is designated as part of the Frontier Pathways National Scenic Byway.

The highway passes and intersects many major highways and several state highways along its 207-mile route. In Custer County, Highway 96 crosses the Wet Mountains and passes through the San Isabel National Forest. Its highest point is Hardscrabble Pass at 9,085 feet.

History
The route was established in the 1920s, when the routing was exactly as it is today. Several portions were paved by 1946 including the segment from Pueblo to Boone, Olney Springs to Sugar City, and from Haswell to the Kansas state line. The segment of SH 96 concurrent with US 50 was constructed as an expressway by 1957. The entire route was paved by 1964.

Major intersections

References

External links

096
Transportation in Custer County, Colorado
Transportation in Pueblo County, Colorado
Transportation in Crowley County, Colorado
Transportation in Kiowa County, Colorado
Pueblo, Colorado